This is a list of people who have served as Lord-Lieutenant of Northumberland. Since 1802, all Lords Lieutenant have also been Custos Rotulorum of Northumberland.

Henry Percy, 3rd Earl of Northumberland
Henry Percy, 4th Earl of Northumberland ?–1489
Henry Algernon Percy, 5th Earl of Northumberland 28 April 1489 – 19 May 1527
Henry Hastings, 3rd Earl of Huntingdon 20 August 1586 – 14 December 1595
vacant
George Clifford, 3rd Earl of Cumberland 1603–1605
vacant
Francis Clifford, 4th Earl of Cumberland 27 October 1607 – 31 August 1639 jointly with
George Home, 1st Earl of Dunbar 27 October 1607 – 20 January 1611 and
Theophilus Howard, 2nd Earl of Suffolk 27 October 1607 – 31 August 1639 and
Henry Clifford, 1st Baron Clifford 27 October 1607 – 31 August 1639 and
Thomas Howard, 21st Earl of Arundel 23 July 1632 – 31 August 1639 and
Henry Howard, Lord Maltravers 23 July 1632 – 31 August 1639
Algernon Percy, 10th Earl of Northumberland 13 November 1626 – 1642
Interregnum
Algernon Percy, 10th Earl of Northumberland 12 September 1660 – 13 October 1668 jointly with
Joceline Percy, 11th Earl of Northumberland 12 September 1660 – 31 May 1670
William Cavendish, 1st Duke of Newcastle-upon-Tyne 13 July 1670 – 25 December 1676 jointly with
Henry Cavendish, 2nd Duke of Newcastle-upon-Tyne 13 July 1670 – 20 April 1689
Richard Lumley, 1st Earl of Scarbrough 20 April 1689 – 17 December 1721
Richard Lumley, 2nd Earl of Scarbrough 24 January 1722 – 29 January 1740
Charles Bennet, 2nd Earl of Tankerville 6 March 1740 – 14 March 1753
Hugh Percy, 1st Duke of Northumberland 23 March 1753 – 6 June 1786
Hugh Percy, 2nd Duke of Northumberland 16 September 1786 – 1798
In commission
Hugh Percy, 2nd Duke of Northumberland 4 June 1802 – 10 July 1817
Hugh Percy, 3rd Duke of Northumberland 18 August 1817 – 11 February 1847
Henry Grey, 3rd Earl Grey 13 March 1847 – 1 January 1877
Algernon Percy, 6th Duke of Northumberland 1 January 1877 – 2 January 1899
Albert Grey, 4th Earl Grey 1 March 1899 – 13 December 1904
Henry Percy, 7th Duke of Northumberland 13 December 1904 – 14 May 1918
Alan Percy, 8th Duke of Northumberland 19 July 1918 – 23 August 1930
Sir Charles Trevelyan, 3rd Baronet 7 November 1930 – 28 April 1949
Wentworth Beaumont, 2nd Viscount Allendale 28 April 1949 – 16 December 1956
Hugh Percy, 10th Duke of Northumberland 16 May 1956 – 3 January 1984
Matthew White Ridley, 4th Viscount Ridley 3 January 1984 – 25 August 2000
Sir John Buchanan-Riddell, 13th Baronet 25 August 2000 – 11 May 2009
Jane Percy, Duchess of Northumberland 12 May 2009 – present

Deputy Lieutenants
Deputy Lieutenants traditionally supported the Lord-Lieutenant. There could be many deputy lieutenants at any time, depending on the population of the county. Their appointment did not terminate with the changing of the Lord-Lieutenant, but they often retired at age 75. 

 Edward Grey, 1st Viscount Grey of Fallodon, KG 11 April 1901 
 Sir Benjamin Chapman Browne 11 April 1901 
 Sir William Haswell Stephenson 11 April 1901 
 William Watson-Armstrong, 1st Baron Armstrong 11 April 1901 
 Shallross Fitzherbert Widdrington 11 April 1901 
 Henry de La Poer Beresford, 6th Marquess of Waterford 21 May 1901
 George Montagu Bennet, 7th Earl of Tankerville 21 May 1901 
 Sir Hubert Edward Henry Jerningham, KCMG 21 May 1901 
 Matthew White Ridley, 2nd Viscount Ridley 21 May 1901 
 Lawrence William Adamson, Esq. 21 May 1901 
 Stephen Sanderson, Esq. 21 May 1901 
 John Coppin Straker, Esq. 21 May 1901 
 Hugh Andrews, Esq. 21 May 1901 
 Addington Francis Baker Cresswell, Esq. 21 May 1901 
 de Loriol, Pierre Gabriel Theodore, 1st Count de Loriol Chandieu

References
 

Northumberland
Northumberland